Christophoros of Mytilene (ca. 1000 – after 1050) was a Greek-language poet living in the first half of the 11th century. His works include poems on various subjects and four Christian calendars.

Biography 
Christopher was born in Constantinople, and lived in the neighbourhood Sphorakiou for most of his lifetime. He was an important official, holding high ranks such as patrikios, protospatharios, and krites (judge) of the themes of Armeniakon and Paphlagonia.

Events described in his poems suggest that he started writing in the reign of Romanos III (1028–1034), but most poems can be dated to the reign of Constantine IX (1042–1055), an emperor who favoured culture and literature.

Works 
Various Verses (στίχοι διάφοροι) is the title of his collection of 145 poems, which covers a wide range of genres and topics. The collection seems to have been arranged chronologically. The text of many poems is  severely damaged.

The metre of most poems is the dodecasyllable, but for some Christopher uses the dactylic hexameter. Their language is an artificial Homeric Greek. Elegiac couplets and anacreontics occur as well.

The content of these poems is very heterogeneous. The most remarkable among them are satirical. In these poems Christopher makes fun of unsuccessful chariot drivers, cheated husbands, hypocritical monks, pseudo-intellectuals, etc. Other poems are directed against the mice devouring his books, and an owl that prevents him from sleeping.
Many poems are epigrams with a religious content, touching on Biblical figures or Christian feasts. Some longer poems are funeral orations for his mother and his sister. Some describe historical events, such as the death of Romanos III and the riots of 1042. The longest poem is an encomium on the spider.
The rest of the collection is filled with epitaphs, riddles, dedicatory epigrams, and the like. 

Christopher composed also four calendars in four different metres (hexameter, dodecasyllables, stichera, and canones), commemorating all the saints and feasts of the Orthodox Christian liturgical year.

Christopher's poetry is characterized by a witty tone seldom found in Greek poetry of this period. The mix of Christian and classical elements and the self-asserting intellectual elitism are distinguishing features,  which link him to other poets of the period, like John Mauropous and Michael Psellos, who also were responding to the cultural climate under Constantine IX.

References 
E. Kurtz, Die Gedichte des Christophoros Mytilenaios (Leipzig, 1903).
E. Follieri, I calendari in metro innografico di Cristoforo Mitileneo, I. Introduzione, testo e traduzione, II. Commentario e indici (Bruxelles, 1980).

 Livanos, Christopher, "Justice, Equality, and Dirt in the Poems of Christopher of Mytilene," Jahrbuch der Österreichischen Byzantinistik, 57 (2007).
 C. De Stefani, "Notes on Christophoros of Mytilene and Konstantinos Stilbes," Jahrbuch der Österreichischen Byzantinistik, 58 (2008), 
 M. De Groote, "Christophori Mytilenaii Versuum uariorum Collectio Cryptensis", CCSG 74, (Turnhout, 2012), .

11th-century Byzantine people
Byzantine governors
Byzantine poets
Patricii
People from Constantinople
Protospatharioi
11th-century Byzantine writers